The Franz Josef Glacier (officially Franz Josef Glacier / ) is a  temperate maritime glacier in Westland Tai Poutini National Park on the West Coast of New Zealand's South Island.

The area surrounding the two glaciers is part of Te Wahipounamu, a World Heritage Site park. The Waiho River emerges from the glacier terminal of Franz Josef.

Naming
According to oral tradition, Hine Hukatere loved climbing in the mountains and persuaded her lover Tuawe to climb with her. Tuawe was a less experienced climber than Hine Hukatere but loved to accompany her, until an avalanche swept him from the peaks to his death. Hine Hukatere was broken-hearted and her many, many tears flowed down the mountain. Rangi the Sky Father took pity on her and froze them to form the glacier.

The first European description of one of the West Coast glaciers (believed to be Franz Josef) was made in the log of the ship Mary Louisa in 1859. The glacier was later named after Emperor Franz Joseph I of Austria by the German geologist Julius von Haast in 1865.

Following the passage of the Ngāi Tahu Claims Settlement Act 1998, the name of the glacier was officially altered to Franz Josef Glacier / .

Geography
This combination of factors leads to Franz Josef persisting where most temperate-zone glaciers would have already melted, and allows it to share a valley with temperate rain forest.

Franz Josef Glacier currently terminates  from the Tasman Sea. Near the end of the last ice age about 18,000 years ago it extended to the present-day coastline or even beyond. As it retreated the glacier left behind moraines of accumulated rock and chunks of ice which created coastal hills and lakes. Lake Wombat is a kettle lake created by ice left in a moraine 9000 years ago, while Peters Pool close to the glacier's face arose in the same fashion just 210 years ago.

The Waiho Loop 4 km north of the settlement of Franz Josef is the terminal moraine of Franz Josef Glacier, deposited by the retreating glacier about 12,000–3,000 years ago. An arc of rubble 80 m high, it was too rugged to be cleared for farming, and remains covered in native forest.

Advance and retreat

Franz Josef Glacier exhibits a cyclic pattern of advance and retreat, driven by differences between the volume of meltwater at the foot of the glacier and volume of snowfall feeding the névé. Over the past 14,000 years glaciers worldwide have generally retreated. Most of New Zealand's large glaciers shrank significantly towards the end of the 20th century, a consequence of global warming. However, in the Southern Alps warmer temperatures cause increased precipitation on the western face of the Main Divide, and Franz Josef glacier being short and steep is more sensitive to increased snow in the névé than other glaciers. If the increased precipitation falls as snow, the glacier will advance; if as rain, it will retreat. Increased snowfall takes around 5–6 years to result in changes in the terminus location.

Franz Josef Glacier advanced rapidly during the Little Ice Age, reaching a maximum in the early 18th century. When Haast became the first European to see the glacier it was still much longer than today, and the ice surface was 300 m higher. Between its first official mapping in 1893 and a century later in 1983, Franz Josef Glacier retreated 3 km up the valley.

There were several periods of advance in the 20th century – 1946 to 1951 (340 m), 1965 to 1967 (400 m), 1983 to 1999 (1420 m) and 2004 to 2008 (280 m) – but all were followed by periods of greater retreat.

This cyclic behaviour is well illustrated by a postage stamp issued in 1946, depicting the view from St James Anglican Church. The church was built in 1931, with a panoramic altar window to take advantage of its location. By 1954, the glacier had disappeared from view from the church, but it reappeared briefly in 1997.

Between 1983 and 2008 while most of the world's glaciers were retreating many New Zealand glaciers advanced; Franz Josef regained nearly half the ice it had lost over the previous century. This anomalous growth has been attributed not to increased rainfall but to a series of cool years caused by increased southerly air flow in the Tasman sea. After 2008 the glacier entered a very rapid phase of retreat, shrinking by 1.5 km between 2008 and 2017. It is now once again 3 km shorter than it was 100 years ago.

Floods 
There have been some incidents of jökulhlaups (outbreak floods from water-filled ice tunnels) at the glacier. The névés of Fox and Franz Josef glaciers has one of the world's highest precipitation levels: up to 15 m a year. In December 1965, after 280 mm of rain in two days, the Waiho River broke out of the glacier and carried chunks of ice downriver. These were still up to 50 cm across when they reached the Tasman Sea 20 km downstream. Another flood destroyed the access road bridge in 1989, followed by a further flood in April 1991. Torrential rain destroyed the bridge across the Waiho River in March 2019, and it took 18 days to replace it.

Flora 
Westland Tai Poutini National Park is one of the few places in New Zealand with a full sequence of pristine landscape from mountain peaks to the sea. The retreat of Franz Josef Glacier has allowed native forest to colonise the bare rock left behind, and how long ago the glacier retreated can be read in the stage of plant succession present. Some bare rock was only exposed a decade ago, while other surfaces were exposed in 1951, 1830, 1750, and 1600.

Tourism
Fox and Franz Josef glaciers are the most publicly-accessible glaciers in New Zealand, and among the most accessible in the world – until recently, there was easy walking access directly to the glacier termini. Consequently for over a century they have been a significant tourist attraction.

The glacier is associated with the Graham family, in particular mountaineers and guides Alec and Peter Graham and Rose Graham and historian Dorothy Fletcher (née Graham). Services in their hotel brought about the construction of St James Church.

Extract from the February 1936 issue of National Geographic Magazine:
But the Franz Josef Glacier and its background of mountains is worth waiting long to see on a clear day. It is one of the most remarkable glaciers in the world. Slipping down from a large snowfield at more than 8,000 feet, it terminates in subtropical bush, only 700 feet above sea level. Movement in its upper reaches is remarkably rapid, 15 or more feet a day.

Airplane flights have proved a popular method of seeing this eight-mile long river of bluish-green ice , pressing down among hills that are aflame in January with red flowering rata trees.

With Captain Mercer, I flew over the glacier and looked out toward the snow fields and bold Alps, and I also went with him on the initial air-mail route in New Zealand.

Today the Franz Josef glacier area is the third-most-visited tourist spot in New Zealand, and one of the main tourist attractions on the West Coast. It had around 250,000 visitors a year in 2008, increasing to 700,000 a year (500,000 overnight) in 2017. It used to be possible to walk up to the glacier, but in March 2012 the terminal face of the glacier collapsed and it is now too dangerous to approach; signs warn against crossing the safety barriers at the lookout. , the valley walk ends at a lookout about 50 m from the main terminal face of the glacier. Visiting the glacier now requires a helicopter flight past the unstable terminal face. Glacier walks also require some specialised equipment, namely ice axes and crampons that latch onto a sturdy boot. These are usually provided by tour companies.

As the walking part of any tour up to the glacier takes a long time, and ends at the first icefall (a  frozen waterfall, draping a natural step in the land underneath), many tourists book helicopter tours from one of the several local airlines, which usually drop their guests between the first and second icefalls, for a guided 1–2 hour walk through the broken ground atop the glacier. Although the glacial landscape changes almost daily, given the glacier's unusually fast flow, and some walks including passages through ice tunnels, they are still considered quite safe and only somewhat strenuous. In June 2010, an Australian tourist died of a heart attack during a guided hike of the glacier.

At the entrance of the valley lies the village of Franz Josef, which has a permanent population of approximately 330 residents. Just south of the village, a sealed road leads from the highway into the Franz Josef Glacier valley and to a car park. Several small walks start from the Valley Road and the car park, and it is also possible to comfortably cycle from Franz Josef township to the car park.

See also
Agassiz Glacier (New Zealand)
Tasman Glacier
Fox Glacier
Glaciers of New Zealand
Glacial retreat since 1850
Climate change in New Zealand

References

External links

 Franz Josef area at the Department of Conservation
 West Coast & Glaciers at New Zealand Tourism
 Franz Josef Glacier Daily Access Updates & Live Webcam at Glacier Country Tourism
 Glaciers of New Zealand at the United States Geological Survey

Glaciers of New Zealand
Westland District
Westland Tai Poutini National Park
Landforms of the West Coast, New Zealand
Franz Joseph I of Austria